Louise Freer Hall, also known as the Women's Gymnasium, is a historic building on the campus of the University of Illinois Urbana-Champaign. Built in 1930, it was the last of the university's buildings designed by Charles A. Platt, who was responsible for the university's overall plan. Like most of Platt's designs for the university, the building has a Georgian Revival plan. The gymnasium originally provided expanded facilities for the women's physical education department, which had outgrown its space in the Woman's Building. The new gymnasium's facilities included two general-purpose spaces, several specialized facilities, and a physical education laboratory. Louise Freer, the women's physical education director for whom the building was later renamed, added a lounge area in 1932 to provide a social space in the building. The building is still used as a gymnasium and hosts intramural sporting events and physical education classes.

Freer Hall has served as the home venue for the Illinois Fighting Illini women's swimming and diving team.

The building was added to the National Register of Historic Places on February 5, 2003.

References

Buildings and structures of the University of Illinois Urbana-Champaign
Buildings and structures completed in 1930
College swimming venues in the United States
Georgian Revival architecture in Illinois
Illinois Fighting Illini swimming venues
National Register of Historic Places in Champaign County, Illinois
Swimming venues in Illinois
Sports venues in Champaign–Urbana, Illinois
University and college buildings on the National Register of Historic Places in Illinois